National Vocational and Technical Training Commission (NAVTTC) is a regulatory body for technical education and vocational training in Pakistan. It was founded by its chairman Altaf M. Saleem.

See also

Technical Education and Vocational Training Authority, Punjab
Sindh Technical Education and Vocational Training Authority

External links

Pakistan federal departments and agencies
Vocational education in Pakistan